Beloye is a rural locality (a selo) and the administrative center of Beloselskoye Rural Settlement of Krasnogvardeysky District, Adygea, Russia. The population was 3088 as of 2018. There are 31 streets.

Geography 
The village is located on the right bank of the Belaya, 14 km southeast of Krasnogvardeyskoye (the district's administrative centre) by road. Preobrazhenskoye is the nearest rural locality.

Ethnicity 
The village is inhabited by Russians and Kurds according to the 2010 census.

References 

Rural localities in Krasnogvardeysky District

Kurdish settlements